Southwest Alentejo and Vicentine Coast Natural Park (PNSACV) is a natural park located in southwest Portugal. It has one of the highest levels of biodiversity in the country with over 12 endemic species of plant and several bird nesting sites.

The park was created on 7 July 1987 in order to promote the protection and sustainable use of natural resources and other natural, landscape and cultural values while promoting the economic, social and cultural development of the region. Since the last decade, the region has been marked by the expansion of intensive agriculture, either sanctioned or actively promoted by the government via the passing of laws that encourage the creation of new greenhouses to grow crops for the export market, dependant on labour that is often exploited, working in living in precarious conditions, and that damages local fauna, flora and water resources.

References

External links
 

Nature parks in Portugal
Alentejo
Geography of the Algarve
Tourist attractions in the Algarve
Natura 2000 in Portugal